El premio mayor, is a Mexican telenovela produced by Emilio Larrosa and written by Verónica Suárez and Alejandro Pohlenz.

Carlos Bonavides, Laura León, Sasha Sokol and Sergio Goyri star as the main protagonists, while Claudio Báez, Lorena Herrera, Martha Julia and Rodrigo Vidal as the main antagonists.

Plot 
Huicho Domínguez (Carlos Bonavides), an uneducated, womanizing family man with two children in working-class Mexico, wins the grand prize jackpot ("el premio mayor") in the national lottery.  He and his family subsequently move into a large mansion and attempt to adjust to the newfound fame and customs associated with the upper class.  Huicho begins to fill his mansion with flamboyant tacky items, and wastes his money shamelessly.  The arc of the storyline revolves around him finding a way to balance the seductive aura of his recent wealth - and the beautiful gold-diggers that appear in his life - with not losing the love of his life, his wife Rebeca (Laura Leon).

Alongside them is Rosario (Sasha Sokol), a good and noble girl who was adopted by Rebeca and Huicho. She is humiliated and mistreated by Huicho and his two children; however, Rebecca is good and sweet towards her and considers her as her own daughter. Rosario has a boyfriend, (Rodrigo Vidal) Diego, who seems to be the ideal man who loves her too; however, he ends up becoming a villain when his boss, Jorge (Sergio Goyri), an unlucky journalist, falls for Rosario too.

The new, rich Huicho begins using his money to attract women and have numerous affairs with the support of his oldest son, Luis Gerardo (Sergio Sendel), who has always been interested in Rosario and becomes another obstacle between her and Jorge, who has two siblings, Lorenzo (Marcelo Buquet) and Sergio (Claudio Báez).  Lorenzo is noble and supports the relationship between Rosario and his brother, while Sergio is evil and jealous of Lorenzo.  Together with his sister-in-law and mistress Antonia (Lorena Herrera), who is Lorenzo's wife, and Sergio's daughter Deborah (Sussan Taunton), they are responsible for countless misdeeds, including making Jorge lose his family.

When Huicho's affairs come to light, mainly due to the sensual and interested Consuelo (Martha Julia), Lorenzo admits his own feelings for Rebeca, leading to devastating family conflicts that will shake the protagonists' faith in money as the solution to their problems.

Cast 

 Carlos Bonavides as Luis "Huicho" Domínguez
 Laura León as Rebeca Molina de Domínguez
 Sasha Sokol as Rosario 'Charo' Domínguez
 Sergio Goyri as Jorge Domensain  
 Lorena Herrera as Antonia Fernández de Domensain / Amelia de Bausate / Florencia de Robledo / Roberta de Reyes Retana / Isabel Villagrán
 Claudio Báez as Sergio Domensain
 Luz María Jerez as Cristina Molina
 Sergio Sendel as Luis Gerardo Domínguez
 Rodrigo Vidal as Diego Rodríguez 
 Martha Julia as Consuelo Flores
 José Ángel García as Esteban Mirélez
 Marcelo Buquet as Lorenzo Domensain
 Sussan Taunton as Déborah Domensain
 Leonor Llausás as Doña Anita López de Domínguez
 Yaxkin Santalucía as Pepe Domínguez
 Diego Luna as Quique Domínguez
 Elsa Navarrete as Concepción 'Conchita' Domínguez
 Irina Areu as Tracy Smith
 Gabriela Araujo as Patricia Molina
 Magdalena Cabrera as Fulgencia Pérez
 Mónica Dossetti as Karla Greta Reyes Retana y de las Altas Torres
 Héctor Suárez Gomis as Gabriel Robledo
 Yolanda Ciani as Gladis
 Roberto Tello as El Carnicero/ Ángel Gómez
 Sergio DeFassio as Cosme Gutiérrez / Demetrio Iregaray de Fuentes y Mares
 Ricardo Silva as Agustín Villagrán
 Carlos Durán as Don Federico Estrada
 Antonio Escobar as Rodrigo
 Lorena Tassinari as Reyna Sánchez (#1)
 Gabriela Arroyo as Reyna Sánchez (#2)
 Patricia Álvarez as Mimí
 José Luis Rojas as Hipólito 'Cachito'
 Anghel as Etelvina
 Alfonso Mier y Terán as Tobi Reyes Retana 
 Alejandro Villeli as Aristóteles
 Marita de Lara as Pocahontas
 José Antonio Iturriaga as Nemesio
 Anthony Álvarez as El Tiburón
 Perla Encinas as Elizabeth Dominguez Molina
 Laura Forastieri as Irene
 Luis Couturier as Anthony Wilson
 Marina Marín as Bety
 Rodrigo Ruiz as Carlos Fernández
 Rodrigo Abed as Gustavo
 Galilea Montijo as Lilí
 Ramón Valdés Urtiz as Jorgito Domensain
 Marco Antonio Regil as Toño
 Francisco Mendoza as Alex
 Salvador Garcini as Juan
 Vanessa Angers as Gema
 Dinorah Cavazos as Iris
 Annette Cuburu as Tracy 
 Jorge Becerril as José Ospina
 Oyuki Manjarrez as Lolita
 Fernando Manzano as El Hidráulico
 Osvaldo Benavides as Chicles
 Zayda Castellón as Pascuala
 Ranferi Negrete as Damián
 Juan Romanca as Comandante Hugo Ortega
 Rodolfo de Alejandre as Pollo
 Sylvia Valdés as Ruperta
 Iván Perea as El Perico / Omar Sánchez
 Mónica Prado as Mamá de Mimí
 Alejandro Avila as Hugo
 Octavio Menduet as Comandante Torres
 Mariana Huerdo as Andrea
 Jonathan as Jonathan
 Archie Lafranco as Daniel

References

External links 

1995 telenovelas
Televisa telenovelas
1995 Mexican television series debuts
1996 Mexican television series endings
Mexican telenovelas
Spanish-language telenovelas